Boykin's Tavern is a historic inn and tavern located at Isle of Wight, Isle of Wight County, Virginia. The original structure was built about 1790, and expanded to two stories with a -story gambrel-roofed wing in the early 19th century. A two-story wing and two-story porch were added in 1900–1902. It has four brick external end chimneys and a standing seam metal gable roof. The interior reflects the transition between the Colonial and Federal styles. It is the only surviving structure associated with the Isle of Wight Courthouse of 1800. The building is occupied by a local history museum.

It was listed on the National Register of Historic Places in 1974.

References

External links

 Boykin's Tavern Museum website

History museums in Virginia
Drinking establishments on the National Register of Historic Places in Virginia
Federal architecture in Virginia
Commercial buildings completed in 1790
Buildings and structures in Isle of Wight County, Virginia
National Register of Historic Places in Isle of Wight County, Virginia
Museums in Isle of Wight County, Virginia